Pierre Michel Sprey (November 22, 1937 – August 5, 2021) was a record producer and a defense analyst. Working with John Boyd and Thomas P. Christie at the Pentagon, he was associated with the self-dubbed 'Fighter Mafia', which advocated the use of energy–maneuverability theory in fighter jet design.

Sprey was born in Nice, France in 1937, and raised in New York. Sprey was admitted to Yale university at the age of fifteen and graduated after four year with a double major in French literature and Mechanical Engineering. He later continued his education at Cornell University where he studied mathematical statistics and operations research. He subsequently worked at Grumman Aircraft as a consulting statistician on space and commercial transportation projects. From 1966 to 1970 he was a special assistant at the Office of the Secretary of Defense.

Defense analyst, criticism of the F-15 

During the 1960s, Pierre Sprey was associated with a group of defense analysts who called themselves the 'Fighter Mafia'. He was a weapons system analyst working for the Office of the Assistant Secretary of Defense for Systems Analysis. The 'Fighter Mafia' group of defense analysts worked behind the scenes in the late 1960s to advocate a lightweight fighter as an alternative to the McDonnell Douglas F-15 Eagle.

The Fighter Mafia strongly believed that an ideal fighter should not include any of the sophisticated radar and missile systems or rudimentary ground-attack capability that found their way into the F-15. Their goal, based on energy–maneuverability theory, was a small, low-drag, low-weight, pure fighter with no bomb racks - similar to those found in the early-World War II designs. The Fighter Mafia claims it influenced the design requirements of the highly successful General Dynamics F-16 Fighting Falcon, although they were not happy with design changes made to the YF-16 as it became a costlier multi-role fighter rather than the lighter air-to-air specialist they originally envisioned. Sprey continued to be critical of the F-15 fighter.

Pierre Sprey left the Pentagon in 1971. He and Colonel John Boyd worked with others in the Pentagon and Congress toward military reform, helping gain passage of military reform legislation in the early 1980s.

Role in A-X(YA-9 and A-10 Thunderbolt II) concept design 
While working as an analyst for the OSD, Sprey was recruited by colonel Avery Kay to help with the concept formulation of the A-X. Sprey would play a role in formulating the A-X Concept Formulation Package describing the flight characteristics and capabilities of the plane. Sprey helped adapt the experience and practical knowledge of German WW2 ace Hans-Ulrich Rudel with the theoretical approach of German WW2 aerospace engineer Hans Multhopp to the Vietnam War experience of the A-1 pilots also working in the concept formulation group. Sprey was an advocate for the A-X carrying a large calibre gun.

Criticism of the F-35 and A-10 divestment 
Sprey was a frequent critic of the Lockheed Martin F-35 Lightning II program. He argued, paralleling his earlier arguments against the F-15, that despite its high cost the F-35 is less agile than the F-16. Sprey argued that compared to the F-16 or A-10 (in both of whose operational roles it is marketed to operate) the F-35 was overweight and dangerous, stating "It's as if Detroit suddenly put out a car with lighter fluid in the radiator and gasoline in the hydraulic brake lines: That's how unsafe this plane is…" and "full of bugs".

He argued that in the close air support (CAS) role, the F-35 is a poor replacement for the A-10 as it flies too fast for pilots to spot targets by eye and lacks maneuverability at low speeds. He said it lacks the necessary radios, cannot survive small arms fire (or anti-aircraft guns) and has poor loiter time. Sprey contended that close air support should be the Air Force's most important mission and that the USAF has been trying to retire the A-10 for years simply because it does not want the CAS mission.

Sprey was interviewed on his views of the F-35 by the popular press, on the politics and policy news network C-SPAN, at a meeting of the activist group "Stop the F-35", and during a podcast of a debate between Sprey and a retired US Marine Corps combat pilot and instructor at the "TOPGUN" United States Navy Strike Fighter Tactics Instructor program who had piloted both the F-35B STOVL variant and the Lockheed Martin F-22 Raptor, on the website of Aviation Week and Space Technology magazine.

Record production 
Pierre Sprey recorded music through his own label Mapleshade Records and sold high-end audiophile equipment. His recording with the Addicts Rehabilitation Center (ARC) Choir singing "Walk With Me" appears in Kanye West's 2004 hit "Jesus Walks." Sprey said he earned enough royalties from the West song "to support 30 of my money-losing jazz albums."

Sprey's recording techniques are highly unconventional, aiming for accurate reproduction of live music rather than manipulating sounds (e.g. with equalizers, pitch correction, etc.).

Death 
Sprey died on August 5, 2021 of an apparent heart attack.

References

External links

Pierre Sprey, "Countering a Warsaw Pact Blitz", in Proceedings of the Seminar on Antitank Warfare, May 25–26, 1978 (discusses design considerations for future antitank aircraft)
Pierre Sprey, Combat Effectiveness Considerations in Designing Close Support Aircraft(n.d., 1970s) (slide presentation)

American record producers
1937 births
2021 deaths
Aviation analysts
People from Nice
French emigrants to the United States
United States Department of Defense officials
20th-century United States government officials
Yale University alumni
Cornell University alumni